Udenu is a Local Government Area of Enugu State, Nigeria. Its headquarters are in the town of Obollo-Afor (or Obolo) on the A3 highway.

Udenu local government has boundary with Nsukka at Nru Nsukka with Orba-Udulekenyi (popularly known as Orba).

History 
Politically, Udenu is a Local Government Area of Enugu State, Nigeria. Its headquarters are in the town of Obollo-Afor on the A3 highway. Geographically, It has an area of 248 km2 and a population of 178,466 at the 2006 census. The postal code of the area is 412.

Historically, Udenu as a local government was first carved out of the old Isi-Uzo local government in 1981. This second republic creation of the local government by Alahaji Shehu shagari regime did not last as military government led by  major General Muhamadu Buhari overthrew the then government and announced the proscription of all the newly created local governments.

Hon. Silas Odoh who hails from Ezimo administered the local government between 1981-1983 and Hon. Okey  Ogbonna (Caesar) who is from Amalla also administered the council for only six months before the military struck.

On October 1, 1996, Udenu was once again created alongside others by the military government of General Sani Abacha in preparation for his transformation into a civilian president. A sole administration in the person of Samuel A. Ozioko (KSM) was immediately appointed to head the newly created local government with ten electoral wards. It has a population of about 178, 687 (88,381 males and 90,306 females) according to 2003 census conducted all over the federation.

Presciently Udenu has three development centers and about twenty five (25) Autonomous  communities. The development centers include; Udenu, Udunedem and Orba Development centers.

For Details, Udenu development centres is made up of Amalla, Ifruka Umu Enachi, umu Egali, Obollo-Afor, Umu Ekwenu, iheakpu, Obollo-Nkwo Ibenda; Obollo-Orie, Obollo-Etiti, Ogwu/Ugbabe Uwani, Isi-Enu and Ajorogwu communities. Presently, Udenu is being administered by Dr. Daniel Ugwu.

Orba development centre comprises Ohom, Ajuona, Agu Orba and Orba communities and is being presently administered by Beatice Ezeaku.

While udeunedem development centre has Umundu, Ogbodu-Aba, Igugu, Ezimo Ulo, Ezimo Agu, Imilike Etiti Imilike Enu and Imilike Ani Communities.

Number Of Local Govt. Chairman/Administrators Since Inception 
A local government election conducted in 1997 paved way to the reemergence of the first executive chairman of the present Udenu local government in the person of Hon. Chief (comrade) James .O. Ugwu, Igwurube I of Udenu from Imilike ward.

This government of the Democratic Party of Nigeria, though enmeshed in post-election litigation with the opposing united Nigeria people's party (UNCP) Concluded its Tenure  in 1999.

The demise of the Nigerian maximum dictator in June 1998 Ushered in a new military government of General  Abdusalam Abubakar which dissolved the existing political parties and formed new ones.

In 1999, the second executive chairman of Udenu Local  Government  was Ushered in. The then chairman, chief Hon. Eugene Odoh of obollo-Afor who ran on the platform of All People's party (APP) which later became All Nigerian Peoples's Party, his executive government lapsed in 2001 and he was re-sworn in as a caretaker committee chairman which ended in 2002.

Following the exit of Hon. Eugene Odoh in 2002, a transition committee chaired by chief (Hon) Bernard A. Eze who hails from Obollo-Afor came in the saddle. The transition government of chief Barnard Eze ended in 2003 after the general Election, Again, chief Bernard Eze was restored back as Udenu local Govt. caretaker committee chairman in 2003. the Govt. came to an end in 2004, when the then head of personnel  management (HPM) in the person of chief B.B.C. Ayogu (JP) took over as a sole administrator. In the same 2004 a local government election was conducted and his regime came to an end. The local government election conduct in 2004 brought in the third executive chairman of Udenu local government. The person so elected was Hon, Fabian Ugwu (Okosisi) of the people's Democratic party who hails from Obollo-Eke. The government of Hon. Fabian Ugwu ran into troubled water while Kevin Ojobor, his deputy from Amalla ward acted for ten months. The suspension on Hon. Fabian ugwu was later lifted and he took over his exalted office. He later handed over to a caretaker government in 2007.

At the third quarter of 2007, a caretaker government was sworn in, in Udenu local government. This was chaired by Chief Hon. Innocent Anayo Eze from Obollo-Etiti ward. Within four months of its inception, a local government election was conducted and the caretaker committee government handed over to the fourth executive chairman of Udenu local government.

In January 2008, the fourth executive chairman of Udenu local government was brought in. The chairman was Hon. Prince Ezeh; a medical doctor who hails from Amalla ward, though politically based in Obollo-Etiti. The tenure of this administration lapsed in January 2010.

On 4 January 2010, the fifth executive chairman of Udenu local government emerged in the person of Dr Godwin Ejikeme Abonyi. After two years of effective administration, he was reelected and again sworn in on 4 January 2012. Then, Dr Godwin Abonyi was saddled with task of delivering the dividend of democracy to the people of Udenu local government.
In January 2014, the sixth executive chairman of Udenu Hon. Amaechi Nwodo was sworn in and he piloted the affairs of the local government until the governor of the state adopted the caretaker system which brought Hon. Frank Ugwu from Orba ward as the caretaker on 11 January 2016.

In 2017, an election was conducted and Hon. Frank Ugwu officially became the seventh executive chairman of Udenu local government. He is currently piloting the affairs of the local government till date.

Presently, the Local Government Chairman of Udenu is Hon. Frank Ugwu.

The postal code of the area is 412.

References 

Local Government Areas in Enugu State
Local Government Areas in Igboland